Keable is a surname. Notable people with the surname include:

Cale Keable (born 1976), American politician
Robert Keable (1887–1927), English writer, Anglican priest and missionary
Russell Keable, British composer and conductor
Sasha Keable (born 1994), English singer-songwriter